Jean-Pierre Soucy (born December 20, 1952) is an educator, civil servant and former politician in Quebec. He represented Portneuf in the Quebec National Assembly from 2003 to 2007 as a Liberal.

He was born in Quebec City, the son of André Soucy and Gérardine Côté, and was educated at the Université Laval, the Université du Québec à Montréal and the Université de Sherbrooke. He taught English and Physical Education at Sainte-Catherine-de-la-Jacques-Cartier. Soucy was director general for Fossambault-sur-le-Lac from 1995 to 1999 and for the Regional Municipality of Portneuf from 2000 to 2003. He was mayor of Shannon from 1989 to 1995 and prefect for Jacques-Cartier from 1993 to 1995. In 2007, he became director general for the Portneuf school board.

References 
 

1952 births
Living people
Quebec Liberal Party MNAs
Mayors of places in Quebec
21st-century Canadian politicians